This is a list of seasons completed by the Western Michigan Broncos football team.

Season

References

Western Michigan

Western Michigan Broncos football seasons